Taïf is an arrondissement of Mbacké in Diourbel Region in Senegal.

References 

Arrondissements of Senegal